Ulta Seedha (transl. Upside down right side up) is a 1985 Indian Bollywood comedy drama film directed and produced by Subodh Mukherji. It stars Raj Babbar, Rati Agnihotri in pivotal roles.

Cast
 Raj Babbar as Ramesh Saxena
 Rati Agnihotri as Shobha Roy
 Deven Verma as Sapan Kumar
 Aruna Irani as Bahji
 Madan Puri as Colonel Khurana
 Utpal Dutt as Justice M. K. Roy
 Chand Usmani as Mrs. Roy
 Agha as Robert
 Shubha Khote as Mrs. Robert
 Dalip Tahil as Dhanraj Singh
 Dinesh Hingoo as Dr. Malik
 Sudha Chopra as Mrs. Khurana

Soundtrack
Lyrics: Majrooh Sultanpuri

References

External links

1980s Hindi-language films
1985 films
Films scored by Rajesh Roshan
Indian drama films